Marthe Hoffnung Cohn (born 13 April 1920) is a French author,  nurse, former spy and Holocaust survivor. She wrote about her experiences as a spy during the Holocaust in the book Behind Enemy Lines.

Early life 
On 13 April 1920, Marthe Cohn was born as Marthe Hoffnung in Metz, France. She was born into an Orthodox Jewish family as one of seven children. Her family lived near the German border in France when Hitler rose to power. As the Nazi occupation escalated, her sister was sent to Auschwitz while her family fled to the south of France just after the reannexation of Alsace-Lorraine by France in 1918. Metz had been a German possession from 1871 to 1918, acquired as part of Alsace-Lorraine in the Franco-Prussian war and relinquished after World War I. She witnessed antisemitism near home with the defacement of the Synagogue of Metz.

Career 
In September 1939, according to the order of civil evacuation, she hid, like many mosellans, at Poitiers in the department of Vienne. After the French Occupation in June 1940, and the annexation of the Moselle by the Third Reich in July 1940, she decided to stay in Vienne.

After the arrest of her sister Stéphanie by the Gestapo on the 17th of June 1942, Marthe organized her family’s escape, from Poitiers to the free zone. There, she survived thanks to false papers, put together before she left. Her fiancé, Jacques Delaunay, a student she had met at Poitiers, who was actively engaged in the French resistance, was shot on the 6th of October 1943 at the fortress of Mont-Valérian, at Suresnes. In November 1943, Marthe Cohn finished her studies, which she had begun in October 1941 in Poitiers, at the nursing school of the French Red Cross, in Marseille. She then tried, in vain, to join the Resistance.

In November 1944, after the liberation of Paris, Marthe Hoffnung enlisted and became a member of the Intelligence Service of the French 1st Army, commanded by Marshal of France Jean de Lattre de Tassigny. After 14 unsuccessful attempts to cross the front in Alsace, she crossed the border into Germany near Schaffhausen in Switzerland. As a nurse fluent in German, she assumed the identity of a German nurse and claimed she was searching for her missing fiancée. She would then crawl back across the Swiss border to relay the information back to the French intelligence. She was able to report to her service two major pieces of information: that northwest of Freiburg, the Siegfried Line had been evacuated and where the remnant of the German Army lay in ambush in the Black Forest.

After the war Marthe returned to France to pursue a career as a nurse, but in 1956, while studying in Geneva, she met an American medical student, Major L. Cohn, who was the roommate of a friend. Within three years, they were married and living in the United States. Now both retired, they had worked together for years, he as an anesthesiologist and she as a nurse anesthetist. Cohn lives in Palos Verdes, California.

Cohn was decorated with the Croix de Guerre in 1945 with two citations (Decisions Number 134 signed by Le Lieutenant-Colonel Bouvet on August 9, 1945 & Number 1322 signed by Marechal Juin on November 10, 1945). In 1999, the French government awarded her the Médaille militaire, Decree Number 3465 MR 1999. She was awarded the title of Knight of France's Legion of Honour (Decree Number 2702, MR 2004) by André Bord, the national veterans minister in 2002. In 2006, she was again honored by the Government of France with the Medaille of the Reconnaissance de la Nation.

In 2002, she co-authored with Wendy Holden a book about her experiences entitled, Behind Enemy Lines: the True Story of a French Jewish Spy in Nazi Germany and was published by Harmony Books. The book was translated into French by Helene Prouteau and published by Plon as well as Selection du Reader's Digest and The Editions Tallandier, a prestigious publishing house in Paris.

Awards and honors
 Croix de Guerre, 1945
 Médaille militaire, 1999
 Legion of Honour, Knight 2002
 Woman of Valor, from the Simon Wiesenthal Center, 2002
 Medal of the Nation's Gratitude, 2006
 The Cross of the Order of Merit, Germany's Highest Honor

Film
A 2019 film, Chichinette: The Accidental Spy, is about Marthe Cohn's life and was made by writer-director Nicola Alice Hens and produced by Amos Geva.

Bibliography

References

Further reading
 C-SPAN video

External links
, documentary about Cohn

1920 births
Living people
French centenarians
French nurses
Female resistance members of World War II
Chevaliers of the Légion d'honneur
Recipients of the Croix de Guerre 1939–1945 (France)
Jewish resistance members during the Holocaust
People from Palos Verdes, California
French women in World War II
Jews in the French resistance
French Resistance members
Jewish French writers
Jewish women writers
Female wartime spies
Women centenarians
21st-century French women writers
French emigrants to the United States
Writers from Metz
20th-century French women writers